Saint Clement School, also Saint Clement Junior-Senior High School, was a private, Roman Catholic secondary school in Medford, Massachusetts.  It was located in the Roman Catholic Archdiocese of Boston.

Background
Saint Clement High School was established in 1925 by the Sisters of St. Joseph.

In 1984, the Anchormen advanced all the way to the MA State Eastern Mass Division 5 Super Bowl Championship; winning over Blue Hills (22 - 6) at BU Nickerson Field.

In 2013, the Football team won the Catholic Central Small championship for the second time and advanced all the way to the State Semi-Finals in the state playoffs, where they lost 40-20 to Cohasset for the right to advance to the state championship. St. Clement finished the season with a 9-3 record.

In its final years it had preschool to kindergarten as well as 6012. In the 2012-2013 school year it had 256 students in all grade levels, but this declined to 147 in the 2016-2017 school year. In 2017, it was announced the school was to shut down on June 9 of that year, citing low enrollment.

Notes and references

External links
 

Catholic secondary schools in Massachusetts
Schools in Middlesex County, Massachusetts
Educational institutions established in 1925
1925 establishments in Massachusetts